Hansson is a Swedish patronymic surname meaning "son of Hans": itself of the same origin as John via the Latin form Johannes. Notable people with the surname include:

Anders Hansson (disambiguation)
Bo Hansson, Swedish musician
David Heinemeier Hansson, Danish programmer
Hans Hansson (skier)  (1919–2003), Swedish alpine skier who competed in the 1948 Winter Olympics
Henry Hansson (1918–1945), Norwegian resistance member
Holger Hansson (1927–2014), Swedish footballer and manager
Ingvar Hansson, Swedish sailor and Olympic champion
Johan Hansson, Swedish footballer
Malou Hansson, Miss Sweden in 2002
Marcus Hansson, Swedish former 500cc Grand Prix motocross world champion 
Martin Hansson, Swedish football referee
Maud Hansson, Swedish film actress 
Mikael Hansson, Swedish footballer
Niran Hansson (born 1996), Thai footballer
Ola Hansson  (1860–1925), Swedish poet, prose writer 
Pär Hansson, Swedish football goalkeeper 
Per Albin Hansson (1885–1946), Swedish Prime Minister 
Peter Hansson, Swedish guitarist 
Petter Hansson, Swedish footballer 
Roger Hansson (ice hockey) (born 1967), Swedish ice hockey player
Roger Hansson (sport shooter) (born 1970), Swedish sport shooter

Hansson is also an Icelandic surname when the father is unknown (hans translates as "his" in Icelandic), which was common among children born to Allied soldiers and Icelandic women in the aftermath of the Allied occupation of Iceland during World War II.

See also
Hanson (surname)

References

Surnames from given names
Swedish-language surnames
Patronymic surnames